André Dierickx (born 29 October 1947) is a Belgian former professional road racing cyclist who competed between 1969 and 1981. He competed in the individual road race at the 1968 Summer Olympics.

Notable results 

1970 – Flandria-Mars
 1st, GP Pino Cerami
 1st, Nokere Koerse
 1st, Grote Prijs Beeckman-De Caluwé
1972 – Flandria-Beaulieu
 2nd, Paris–Roubaix
1973 – Flandria-Carpenter
 1st, La Flèche Wallonne
 1st, Züri-Metzgete
1974 – Flandria-Carpenter
 55th, Tour de France
1975 – Rokado
 1st, La Flèche Wallonne
 1st, GP Kanton Aargau
 1st, Grand Prix de Wallonie
 1st, Grote Prijs Beeckman-De Caluwé
 3rd, Paris–Roubaix
1976 – Maes-Rokado
 1st, GP Union Dortmund
 1st, Grote Prijs Beeckman-De Caluwé
1977 – Maes-Pils
 2nd, Liège–Bastogne–Liège

References

1947 births
Living people
Belgian male cyclists
Cyclists at the 1968 Summer Olympics
Olympic cyclists of Belgium
People from Oudenaarde
Tour de Suisse stage winners
Cyclists from East Flanders